Rajkumar Sharma is the name of:

 Rajkumar Sharma (cricketer)
 Rajkumar Sharma (politician)
 Rajkumar Sharma (director), Indian director; see Mai (1989 film)

See also 
 Ram Kumar Sharma